Bugrino is a rural locality (a village) in Kubenskoye Rural Settlement, Vologodsky District, Vologda Oblast, Russia. The population was 50 as of 2002.

Geography 
Bugrino is located 49 km northwest of Vologda (the district's administrative centre) by road. Voskresenskoye is the nearest rural locality.

References 

Rural localities in Vologodsky District